Christina Yvette Ellington Pares, (born 1982), is a Charter school principal, beauty queen and entertainer in the tri-state area.

Pares' first major beauty pageant title was Miss New York 2004, which she won competing as Miss Southern New York. She had previously placed second runner-up in 2003 as Miss Manhattan, and second runner-up in 2002 as Miss Five Boroughs.  Pares is an opera singer who won a preliminary talent award in 2004, and tied for the award in 2002.  She also won the evening gown award in 2004.

Pares represented her state at the Miss America 2005 pageant televised live from Atlantic City, New Jersey in September 2004.  She was a top ten finalist in the pageant, which was won by Deidre Downs of Alabama.

Pares is known for her initiatives with childhood cancer and urban city education, which she incorporated into her pageant platform: "The Power of our Nation's Educators"

Pares grew up in Connecticut and attended Danbury High School.  As well as Miss New York, Pares has held a number of other titles, including Miss Connecticut Teen America where she was 1st runner up to Miss Teen America 2001, Miss Southern New England Teen 1998, Miss Manhattan, Miss Five Boroughs, and Miss Southern New York.

She went to the prestigious New York University Tisch School of the Arts - Collaborative Arts Project 21 Musical Theatre Conservatory for her undergraduate studies.  She has played leading roles from Maria in West Side Story to a one-woman show as Ethel Waters. She continued her studies at New York University and earned a master's degree in May 2007.

She resides in Danbury, Connecticut and is the Principal at Achievement First Bridgeport Academy Middle School in Bridgeport, CT.

External links
  Miss New York official website
  A Vision in Motion
  It's a wonderful state
  Miss New York a local beauty

Living people
1982 births
Miss America 2005 delegates
People from Danbury, Connecticut
People from Manhattan
Tisch School of the Arts alumni
Miss New York winners
American school principals
Danbury High School alumni